Levicepolis is a genus of gastropods belonging to the family Cepolidae.

Species:

Levicepolis nemoralina 
Levicepolis phaedra

References

 Bank, R. A. (2017). Classification of the Recent terrestrial Gastropoda of the World. Last update: July 16th, 2017

Cepolidae (gastropods)
Gastropod genera